Chatham Baroque is an instrumental ensemble.

History

The group was founded in 1990. The trio of baroque violin, viola da gamba, theorbo and baroque guitar tours nationally and internationally, has recorded seven CDs on the Dorian label and hosts a concert series in Pittsburgh.

Chatham Baroque has toured across the United States and in South America and Mexico, the Virgin Islands, and Canada.

Personnel
 Andrew Fouts, baroque violin
Patricia Halverson, viola da gamba
Scott Pauley, theorbo, lute and baroque guitar

Noted guest artists

Notable guest artists include Philip Anderson, Julie Andrijeski, Andrew Appel, Allison Edberg, Danny Mallon, Sherazade Panthanki, Stephen Schultz, and Adam Pearl.

Discography

Chatham Baroque has 11 professionally recorded CDs: No Holds Barred (2017), Bach & Before (2013), Alla Luce (2009), Sweet Desire (2008), Chatham Baroque Live (2006), Henry Purcell Sonatas and Theatre Music (2002), Reel of Tulloch (2001), Españoleta (2000, re-release 2017), Danse Royale (1999), Sol y Sombra (1999), and The Scotch Humor (1998).

References

External links
 https://www.chathambaroque.org/

Classical music trios
Musical groups established in 1990